Jesse C. "J.C." Moore is an American politician who served one term in the Kansas House of Representatives as a Republican from the 93rd district during 2019 and 2020.

Moore was initially elected in 2018; he narrowly defeated fellow Republican John Whitmer in the primary election, 51% to 49%, and faced an easier race in the general election, triumphing by a 70-30 margin over Democrat Clifton Beck. In 2020, he was defeated soundly in the primary by Brian Bergkamp, who went on to succeed him as representative.

References

Living people
Year of birth missing (living people)
Republican Party members of the Kansas House of Representatives
21st-century American politicians
People from Clearwater, Kansas